Rex Noel Hartwig (2 September 1929 – 30 December 2022) was an Australian tennis player.

Early life
Rex Hartwig was born on  2 September 1929 in Culcairn, New South Wales. Both parents played tennis, and at age 10, Hartwig won a local tournament with his father. When he was 13, he began competing in afternoon competitions and took a job managing tennis courts in Albury. He formed a doubles team with Allan Kendall Jr., and the team won the NSW, Victorian and Australian Junior titles.

Tennis career
Hartwig was ranked World No. 5 in both 1954 and 1955 by Lance Tingay of The Daily Telegraph.

Wimbledon
He won the doubles in Wimbledon twice: in 1954 with Mervyn Rose and in 1955 with Lew Hoad.

Australian Championships
In 1953, he won the doubles with Mervyn Rose and the mixed doubles with Julia Sampson Hayward. In 1954 he again won the mixed doubles title in Melbourne, this time partnering Thelma Coyne Long.

U.S. Championships
In 1953, he won the doubles title at the U.S. Championships with Mervyn Rose, defeating Gardnar Mulloy and Bill Talbert in the final that lasted 77 minutes.

Playing singles, he made the final in 1954, losing to Vic Seixas.

Davis Cup
Hartwig was member of the Australian Davis Cup team in 1953, 1954 and 1955. In 1953, he played the doubles match with Lew Hoad in the challenge round against the USA and lost to Vic Seixas and Tony Trabert. This was Hartwig's only Davis Cup defeat. In 1954, he defeated Seixas in the challenge round that Australia lost to the U.S. In 1955, he made a significant contribution toward Australia's Cup win, playing 11 matches in six ties and winning all of them. He compiled a 12–1 win–loss record in the Davis Cup (6–0 singles, 6–1 doubles).

Other tournaments
In November 1954, Hartwig won the singles title at the New South Wales Championships in Sydney. In the final, he defeated countryman Mervyn Rose in three straight sets.

Professional
In November 1955, Hartwig turned professional by signing a contract with tennis promoter Jack Kramer for a fixed amount of $30,000 plus a percentage of the gate receipts of the professional tour.

Playing style
Hartwig was known for his well-timed groundstrokes and his crisp and accurate volleys. Australian tennis player and coach Harry Hopman characterized Hartwig as a great stylist.

Grand Slam finals

Singles (2 runners-up)

Doubles  (4 titles – 1 runner-up)

Mixed doubles (2 titles, 2 runners-up)

References

External links
 
 
 
 
 British Pathé filmreel – 1953 US Championships Men's Doubles title

1929 births
2022 deaths
Australian Championships (tennis) champions
Australian male tennis players
People from the Riverina
Tennis people from New South Wales
United States National champions (tennis)
Wimbledon champions (pre-Open Era)
Grand Slam (tennis) champions in mixed doubles
Grand Slam (tennis) champions in men's doubles
Professional tennis players before the Open Era
Grand Slam (tennis) champions in boys' doubles
Australian Championships (tennis) junior champions
20th-century Australian people